This is the first edition of the event as a WTA 125 tournament. It was part of the ITF Women's Circuit from 2016 to 2018. Viktória Kužmová was the champion when the event was last held in 2018, but lost in the first round of qualifying to Amarissa Kiara Tóth.

Tamara Korpatsch won the title, defeating Viktoriya Tomova in the final, 7–6(7–3), 6–7(4–7), 6–0.

Seeds

Draw

Finals

Top half

Bottom half

Qualifying

Seeds

Qualifiers

Lucky loser
  Erika Andreeva

Draw

First qualifier

Second qualifier

Third qualifier

Fourth qualifier

References

External Links
Main Draw at wtatennis.com

Budapest Open - Singles